Coppo is both an Italian surname and a given name. Notable people with the name include:

Paul Coppo (born 1938), American ice hockey player
Pietro Coppo (1469/70 – 1555/56), Italian geographer and cartographer
Vincenzo Coppo (born 1905), Italian footballer
Coppo di Marcovaldo (c. 1225 – c. 1276), Florentine painter

Italian-language surnames